Ishaara Nair is an Indian actress who has worked in the Tamil and Telugu film industries.

Career
Ishaara Nair made her debut through the drama film, Venmegam (2014) and before the film's release, she had secured four more film offers. Though her debut film went unnoticed, she won critical acclaim for her role as an innocent saleswoman in Vinoth's con-comedy Sathuranga Vettai (2014). A critic from Sify.com noted Ishara "suits the character to a T and makes a smashing debut", while she won a nomination for Best Debut Actress at the 4th South Indian International Movie Awards. She starred in the unreleased film Papparapaam. Also she dons the role of a college girl in Adhi Medhavigal with VJ Suresh and in one of the lead roles in the horror film, Selfie. Her next signing was Engada Iruthinga Ivvalavu Naala (2021), written and directed by Kevin.

Filmography

References

Living people
Actresses in Tamil cinema
Actresses from Bangalore
21st-century Indian actresses
Indian film actresses
Actresses in Telugu cinema
Actresses from Kerala
People from Idukki district
1986 births